Qingchuan County is a county in the northeast of Sichuan province, China, bordering the provinces of Gansu to the north and Shaanxi to the northeast. It is the westernmost county-level division of the prefecture-level city of Guangyuan. It has an area of 3269 square kilometers and a population of 248,000, including Han Chinese as well as Hui people.

Administrative divisions
Qingchuan has eight towns, 25 townships, and two Ethnic townships.

Towns

Townships

Ethnic townships
 Dayuan Hui (大院回族乡)
 Haoxi Hui (蒿溪回族乡)
Other
Tangjiahe National Nature Reserve (唐家河国家级自然保护区)

Climate

References

External links
Official website of Qingchuan County Government

 
County-level divisions of Sichuan
Guangyuan